Benjamin Arthur Eager (born January 22, 1984) is a Canadian former professional ice hockey player. He won the Stanley Cup with the Chicago Blackhawks in 2010.

Playing career
Eager was drafted in the first round, 23rd overall, by the Phoenix Coyotes in the 2002 NHL Entry Draft. He was later traded by the Coyotes, with goaltender Sean Burke and forward Branko Radivojevič, to the Philadelphia Flyers in exchange for centre Mike Comrie.

The 2006–07 season would see Eager lead the NHL in penalty minutes, even though he only played 63 games. That same season, he also won the Pelle Lindbergh Memorial Trophy as the Flyer who has most improved from the previous season, as voted by his teammates.

Eager was traded to the Chicago Blackhawks on December 18, 2007 for Jim Vandermeer.

Eager scored his first Stanley Cup playoff goal in Game 2 of Chicago's victory against the Vancouver Canucks on May 2, 2009, in Vancouver. This led to the Blackhawks' first victory against the Canucks and evened the series at one game apiece. Eager scored his second playoff goal on May 31, 2010, in Game 2 of the Stanley Cup Finals against his former club, the Philadelphia Flyers. His goal ended up being the game winner, as the 'Hawks won 2–1. On June 9, 2010, he and the Blackhawks won the Stanley Cup, defeating the Flyers 4–3 in overtime in Game 6. 

On June 23, 2010, Eager was traded to the Atlanta Thrashers, alongside Dustin Byfuglien, Brent Sopel, and Akim Aliu, in exchange for the 24th and 54th overall picks in the 2010 NHL Entry Draft, both previously acquired from New Jersey, Marty Reasoner, Joey Crabb and Jeremy Morin. During the 2010–11 season, Eager delivered a sucker punch to the Toronto Maple Leafs' Colby Armstrong. Eager received a five-minute major, a match penalty for intent to injure and was ejected from the game. The NHL further suspended him for four games due to the incident. Midway through the season, he was traded to the San Jose Sharks for a fifth-round pick in 2011.

Eager signed a three-year, $3.3 million contract as an unrestricted free agent with the Edmonton Oilers on July 1, 2011.

On October 20, 2012, Eager was charged with assault, assault with bodily harm and assault with a weapon after allegedly beating up the doorman at a pub in the Rosedale neighbourhood of Toronto.

On March 13, 2013, Eager was placed on waivers by the Oilers for assignment to their American Hockey League (AHL) affiliate, the Oklahoma City Barons.

Eager left the Oilers organization as a free agent and on July 11, 2014, signed abroad on a one-year contract with CSKA Moscow of the Kontinental Hockey League (KHL). He returned mid-season to America, signing for the remainder of the campaign with the Chicago Wolves of the AHL.

In November 2016, Eager was named to the Chicago Blackhawks alumni team to play in the annual NHL Winter Classic.

Career statistics

Regular season and playoffs

International

References

External links

 

1984 births
Living people
Arizona Coyotes draft picks
Atlanta Thrashers players
Canadian ice hockey left wingers
Chicago Blackhawks players
Chicago Wolves players
Edmonton Oilers players
HC CSKA Moscow players
Ice hockey people from Ottawa
National Hockey League first-round draft picks
Oklahoma City Barons players
Oshawa Generals players
Philadelphia Flyers players
Philadelphia Phantoms players
San Jose Sharks players
Stanley Cup champions
Canadian expatriate ice hockey players in Russia